Eneco Stadion may refer to:

Sparta Stadion Het Kasteel - a football stadium in Rotterdam, Netherlands.
Den Dreef - a football stadium in Leuven, Belgium.